The 1983 Major League Baseball season ended with the Baltimore Orioles defeating the Philadelphia Phillies in the fifth game of the World Series. Rick Dempsey was named MVP of the Series. The All-Star Game was held on July 6 at Comiskey Park; the American League won by a score of 13–3, with California Angels outfielder Fred Lynn being named MVP.

Awards and honors
Baseball Hall of Fame
Walter Alston
George Kell
Juan Marichal
Brooks Robinson

Other awards
Outstanding Designated Hitter Award: Greg Luzinski (CWS)
Roberto Clemente Award (Humanitarian): Cecil Cooper (MIL)
Rolaids Relief Man Award: Dan Quisenberry (KC, American); Al Holland (PHI, National).

Player of the Month

Pitcher of the Month

MLB statistical leaders

Standings

American League

National League

Postseason

Bracket

Home Field Attendance

Television coverage

Significant events
April 27 – Nolan Ryan strikes out Brad Mills of the Montréal Expos.  It is the 3,509th strikeout of Ryan's career, breaking the long time record established by Walter Johnson.  Ryan will go on to break his own record 2,205 times before retiring.
June 24 – Don Sutton of the Milwaukee Brewers records the 3,000th strikeout of his career against Alan Bannister of the Cleveland Indians.
July 3 — The Texas Rangers score twelve runs in the fifteenth inning to defeat the Oakland Athletics 16–4, in the process breaking the MLB record for most runs scored during one single extra inning, previously held by the 1928 New York Yankees.
July 24 – In the game now known as the Pine Tar Game, George Brett hits an apparent go-ahead 2-run home run off Goose Gossage in the ninth inning of a game against the New York Yankees at Yankee Stadium. After being called out and having the home run nullified, Brett goes ballistic and charges out of the dugout after McClelland. The AL president's office later upholds the Kansas City Royals protest, restoring the home run, and the game is completed on August 18, with the Royals winning 5–4.
July 29 – Steve Garvey, first baseman for the San Diego Padres dislocates his thumb, and ends his streak of 1,207 consecutive games played. It is still the National League record for consecutive games played, but less than half the American League and MLB record of 2,632 by Cal Ripken Jr. from 1982-98. 
September 28 – The Philadelphia Phillies defeat the Chicago Cubs 13–6, for the 7000th regular season win in their history to clinch the National League East Division title.
October 16 – Eddie Murray slams a pair of home runs and Scott McGregor pitches a five-hitter as the Baltimore Orioles beat the Philadelphia Phillies 5–0 and win the 1983 World Series in Game Five. Baltimore catcher Rick Dempsey, who hit .385 with four doubles and a home run, is the Series MVP.

References

External links
1983 Major League Baseball season at ESPN
1983 Major League Baseball season schedule at Baseball Reference

 
Major League Baseball seasons